Seagram's Seven Crown, also called Seagram's Seven, or simply Seven Crown, is an American blended whiskey produced by Diageo under the Seagram's name. Seagram's beverage division was acquired by Diageo, Pernod Ricard, and The Coca-Cola Company in 2000.

Seagram's Seven is typically consumed in a highball in combination with mixers such as ginger ale, cola or lemon-lime soda. The cocktail made by mixing Seagram's Seven with 7 Up (a brand of lemon-lime soda) is known as a "Seven and Seven". It's also often used as an ingredient in Manhattans. Like most brands of whiskey on the American market, Seagram's Seven has an alcohol by volume level of 40% (80 U.S. proof).

Sales history

Seven Crown was popular in the 1970s, but saw a decrease in success along with most whiskeys in the 1980s and 1990s when many consumers left for vodka and rum. The brand sold thirty-two million cases in 1970, but only sold eight million in 1993.

See also

References

External links

Whiskies of the United States
Diageo brands
Seagram

American brands